This is a list of philosophy-related events in the 15th century.

Events 
 1433 – Baverius de Bonittis starts teaching philosophy and logic at the University of Bologna
   1433   – Ambrogio Traversari completed his translation of Lives and Opinions of Eminent Philosophers

Publications 
 1433 – Lorenzo Valla publishes his much modified second edition of De voluptate (On Pleasure) while on sojourn in Pavia
 1499 – Niccolò Machiavelli, Discorso sopra le cose di Pisa
 1500 – Desiderius Erasmus, Collectanea Adagiorum

Births 
 1433 – Marsilio Ficino (d. 1499). Christian Neoplatonist, head of Florentine Academy and major Renaissance Humanist figure. First translator of Plato's complete extant works into Latin.
   1433   – Nil Sorsky (d. 1508), Russian Hesychast
 c.1467 – Desiderius Erasmus (d. 1536).
 1467 – John Major (or Mair) (d. 1550). Scottish logician

Deaths 
 1432 or 1433 – Ibn Turkah (Sa'in al-Din Turkah Isfahani), an influential Turcoman scholar and Sufist philosopher at the School of Isfahan, exiled by Tamerlane until the latter's death. The date of Ibn Turkah's death is uncertain; either 1432 or 1433.
 1499 – Marsilio Ficino (b. 1433). See

See also
List of centuries in philosophy

References 
Alexander Broadie. History of Scottish Philosophy. Edinburgh University Press. 2009. Chapter 3. Pages 34 to 46.

Bibliography 
 Kristeller, Paul Oskar, Studies in Renaissance Thought and Letters, Volume 3, Edizioni di Storia e Letteratura, 1993 .
 Laos, Nicolas, The Metaphysics of World Order, Pickwick Publications, 2015 .
 Lepage, John L., The Revival of Antique Philosophy in the Renaissance, Palgrave Macmillan, 2012 .
 Lorch, Maristella de Panizza, "Voluptas, molle quoddem et non invidiosum nomen: Lorenzo Valla's defense of Voluptas in the preface to his De voluptate", pp. 214–228 in, Mahoney, Edward Patrick (ed), Philosophy and Humanism, Leiden: E. J. Brill, 1976 .
 Nasr, Seyyed Hossein, Islamic Philosophy from Its Origin to the Present, State University of New York Press .
 Schmitt, Charles B., "John Wolley (ca. 1530–1596) and the first Latin translations of Sextus Empiricus", pp. 61–70 in, Watson, Richard A. (ed); Force, James E. (ed), The Sceptical Mode in Modern Philosophy, Springer, 2012 .

Medieval philosophy
Philosophy by century